The 1983 NAIA women's basketball tournament was the third annual tournament held by the NAIA to determine the national champion of women's college basketball among its members in the United States and Canada.

Defending champions Southwestern Oklahoma State defeated Alabama–Huntsville in the championship game, 80–68, to claim the Bulldogs' second NAIA national title.

The tournament was played in Kansas City, Missouri.

Qualification

The tournament field was again set at eight teams. All teams were seeded.

The tournament utilized a simple single-elimination format, with an additional third-place game for the losers of the two semifinals.

Bracket

See also
1983 NCAA Division I women's basketball tournament
1983 NCAA Division II women's basketball tournament
1983 NCAA Division III women's basketball tournament
1983 NAIA men's basketball tournament

References

NAIA
NAIA Women's Basketball Championships
Tournament
NAIA women's basketball tournament